LZ 120 Bodensee was a passenger-carrying airship built by Zeppelin Luftschiffbau in 1919 to operate a passenger service between Berlin and Friedrichshafen. It was later handed over to the Italian Navy as war reparations in place of airships that had been sabotaged by their crews and renamed Esperia. A sister-ship, LZ 121 Nordstern, was built in 1920: it was handed over to France and renamed Méditerranée.

Design

The Bodensee, designed by Paul Jaray, had an innovative hull shape of relatively low fineness ratio, (ratio of length to diameter). This was arrived at after wind-tunnel tests conducted at the University of Göttingen had shown that this would reduce drag. The framework consisted of eleven 17-sided main transverse frames with a secondary ring frame in each bay, connected by longitudinal girders with a stiffening keel. The forward-mounted control car was combined with the passenger accommodation and was constructed as an integral part of the hull structure rather than being suspended beneath it. Passenger accommodation consisted of five compartments seating four people and a VIP cabin for one. An additional six passengers could be carried on wicker chairs in the gangway between the compartments. A galley and toilets were also fitted. It was powered by four  Maybach Mb.IVa engines, two in a centrally mounted aft gondola driving a single  diameter two-bladed pusher propeller, the other two in a pair of amidships engine cars mounted either side of the hull. These drove  two-bladed propellers via a reversing gearbox to enable reverse thrust for manoeuvering when landing.

A sister-ship LZ 121 Nordstern, similar to the lengthened Bodensee but with modified passenger accommodation, was completed in 1920.

Operational history
Bodensee was first flown on 20 August 1919 piloted by Bernhard Lau. The first passenger-carrying flight was made on 24 August, with Hugo Eckener in command. It made over 100 flights, carrying 2,322 passengers over a total distance of  These flights included a 17-hour voyage between Berlin and Stockholm.

On 3 November 1919 Bodensee suffered a partial engine failure, leading to an accident at Staaken when attempting to land. One of the ground handling crew was killed and several injured, and the airship, lightened after five passengers had jumped out, was then carried off by the wind and eventually brought down near Magdeburg.

In July 1921 Bodensee was handed over to the Italian government as compensation for the Zeppelins which were to have been handed over as war reparations but had been sabotaged by their crews. Two stowaways accompanied the flight to Rome: a German bank clerk and an American cinematographer. Renamed Esperia, the airship made at least one long flight in Italian service, a  voyage lasting 25 hours from Rome to Barcelona and Toulon before being broken up for scrap in July 1928.

The Bodensee'''s sister-ship, LZ 121 Nordstern, was also covered by the reparations decided as part of the peace treaty of June 1919 and was confiscated by the Allies. Nordstern was delivered to France as a war reparation on 13 June 1921 and renamed Méditerranée''.

Specifications (after enlarging)

Notes

References

LZ 120
Rigid airships
Hydrogen airships
Airships of Germany
Airships of France
Airships of Italy